Cecil Elba Duff (November 20, 1896 – November 10, 1969) was an American baseball pitcher for the Chicago White Sox, who made three appearances for the team in 1922 at the age of 25. He batted left-handed and threw right-handed. He was born in Radersburg, Montana, and died in Bend, Oregon.

External links

SABR biography

1896 births
1969 deaths
Major League Baseball pitchers
Chicago White Sox players
Baseball players from Montana
People from Broadwater County, Montana